Turabah (also spelled turaba, turba or tarba) is a city in Najd in Saudi Arabia, located in the valley of the same name.  Turubah is located south of the mountain of Hadhn ("Jebel Hadhn"), to the southeast of Mecca.  It is therefore considered on the border between the topographic regions of Hejaz and Najd.  The town's traditional inhabitants are the tribe of Al-Bugum. The population of Turubah was 42,810 in 2004, while now  in 2020 about 100,000.

See also
 Shanqal Fort
 List of cities and towns in Saudi Arabia
 Regions of Saudi Arabia

References

Populated places in Mecca Province